Monmouth constituency may refer to any one of several constituencies related to the county of Monmouth and the borough of Monmouth, Wales:

 Monmouthshire (UK Parliament constituency), 1801 to 1885, county constituency, previously, 1707 to 1801, county constituency of the Parliament of Great Britain and, until 1707, county constituency of the Parliament of England
 Monmouth borough, 1545 to 1832, which despite its name was a district of boroughs consisting of Monmouth, Newport and Usk and electing one MP to the Parliament of England (1545-1707), Great Britain (1707-1800) and the United Kingdom (1801-1832)
 Monmouth Boroughs (UK Parliament constituency), 1832 to 1918, a renaming of the previous Monmouth borough constituency
 North Monmouthshire (UK Parliament constituency), 1885 to 1918, created as a county constituency division of the county 
 South Monmouthshire (UK Parliament constituency), 1885 to 1918, created as a county constituency division of the county
 West Monmouthshire (UK Parliament constituency), 1885 to 1918, created as a county constituency division of the county
 Monmouth (UK Parliament constituency), 1918 to present, created as a county constituency division of the county of Monmouth, redefined 1983 as a county constituency division of the preserved county of Gwent
 Abertillery (UK Parliament constituency), 1918 to 1983, created as a county constituency division of the county of Monmouth
 Ebbw Vale (UK Parliament constituency), 1918 to 1983, created as a county constituency division of the county of Monmouth
 Pontypool (UK Parliament constituency), 1918 to 1983, created as a county constituency division of the county of Monmouth
 Newport (Monmouthshire) (UK Parliament constituency), 1918 to 1983, created as a borough constituency of the county of Monmouth
 Monmouth (Senedd constituency), 1999 to present, created with the 1999 boundaries of the Monmouth UK Parliament constituency dating from 1918